Marion Kathaleen Bamford is a Zimbabwean paleobotanist, and is a professor at University of the Witwatersrand in Johannesburg, South Africa.

Early life and education 
Marion was born in Zimbabwe. She received her PhD, MSc, and BSc (Honors) at University of the Witwatersrand.

Career 
At University Of The Witwatersrand, she gives lectures about paleobotany to undergraduate students, and researches fossil woods, as well as leaf fossils, seed pollen, phytolith, and stems from the Permian period to the Holocene period. She has published more than 100 journal papers, and is a Fellow of The Royal Society of South Africa.

See also 

 University of the Witwatersrand
 Paleobotany

References

External links 
 
 
 Marion Bamford's Publications on PubFacts

Paleobotanists
Living people
Fellows of the Royal Society of South Africa
Academic staff of the University of the Witwatersrand
University of the Witwatersrand alumni
South African archaeologists
South African women archaeologists
Year of birth missing (living people)